Paul Lynch may refer to:

 Paul Lynch (politician), Australian politician
 Paul Lynch (director) (born 1946), English television director
 Paul Lynch (canoeist) (born 1967), Australian sprint canoeist
 Paul Lynch (footballer) (born 1973), Australian Football League player
 Paul Lynch (hurler) (1938–2014), Irish hurler
 Paul Lynch (writer) (born 1977), Irish writer
 Paul Lynch (American football) (1901–1961), American football player
 Paul Henry Allen Lynch, world record holder for push-ups